Diversion of Water from the Meuse Case (Netherlands v. Belgium)[1937], P.C.I.J. (Ser. A/B) No. 70. was a judgment of the Permanent Court of International Justice on terms of treaties.
 
An 1863 treaty between Belgium and the Netherlands regulated water use of the Meuse River to ensure sufficient flow for navigation and irrigation. As the economic use of the river valley developed, increased pressure was placed on the river. In 1937, the Netherlands brought proceedings, alleging that Belgium’s use of the river had expanded beyond the terms of the treaty. Belgium filed counterclaims against expansion projects by the Netherlands. 

The Court concluded that the Treaty did not prevent either State from developing the river resources as they had been doing.

References

1937 in case law
1937 in international relations
Belgium–Netherlands relations
Permanent Court of International Justice cases
1937 in Belgium
1937 in the Netherlands